The 1912 Idaho gubernatorial election was held on November 5, 1912. Republican nominee John M. Haines defeated Democratic incumbent James H. Hawley with 33.24% of the vote.

General election

Candidates
Major party candidates
John M. Haines, Republican 
James H. Hawley, Democratic

Other candidates
G. H. Martin, Progressive
L. A. Coblentz, Socialist

Results

References

1912
Idaho
Gubernatorial